The 2007 Southern Conference men's basketball tournament took place between Wednesday, February 28 and Saturday, March 3 at the North Charleston Coliseum in North Charleston, South Carolina. The Davidson Wildcats won the championship to secure their 9th trip to the NCAA Men's Division I Basketball Championship.

Standings

Bracket

* Overtime game

See also
List of Southern Conference men's basketball champions

References

Tournament
Southern Conference men's basketball tournament
Southern Conference men's basketball tournament
Southern Conference men's basketball tournament
Southern Conference men's basketball tournament